Fulham Island is a privately owned island with an area of .  It is part of the Sloping Island Group, lying close to the south-eastern coast of Tasmania around the Tasman and Forestier Peninsulas in Tasmania, Australia.

Owner
In 2016, Fulham Island was purchased by the Singaporean Hotelier and property magnate Koh Wee Meng (Aka "James Koh") through his company "JK Island Pty Ltd". James Koh is a billionaire and controls Singapore-listed Fragrance Group. Despite facing objections in a Tasmanian planning tribunal from local wildlife groups, James Koh's company continues construction of a jetty on the island.

Marine
Waldemar reef is present at the north-east end of Fulham island.

Flora and fauna
The island has been extensively grazed and the vegetation is dominated by introduced grasses, bracken, boxthorn and some remnant blackwoods.

Recorded breeding seabird species are little penguin, short-tailed shearwater and kelp gull.

See also
Old county map featuring Fulham island as 'Green Island'.

References

Sloping Island Group
Private islands of Tasmania